Saad bin Saud Al Saud (1924–1977) was a Saudi royal and military officer who served as the commander of the Saudi Arabian National Guard (SANG) between 1959 and 1963. He was a son of the second king of Saudi Arabia, King Saud ( 1953-1964), and the grandson of the country's founder and first ruler, King Abdulaziz ( 1932–1953).

Biography
Prince Saad bin Saud was born in 1924 as the son of Prince Saud bin Abdulaziz and Baraka Al Raziqi Al Alma'i. His father, Prince Saud, was the son of the Arabian leader Abdulaziz. His mother, Baraka, was from Asir in southwest Saudi Arabia. Prince Saad had a full brother, Prince Muhammed. 

In 1959 Prince Saad became the commander of SANG, replacing his half-brother Prince Khalid in the post. Prince Saad's tenure ended in August 1963 when Crown Prince Faisal named Prince Abdullah bin Abdulaziz (later King Abdullah) as commander of SANG.

Saad bin Saud died in 1977.

References

Saad
1924 births
1977 deaths
Saad
Saad